Giacomo "Jackie" DiNorscio (July 20, 1940 – November 14, 2004) was a member of the Philadelphia and later the Lucchese crime families. He acted as his own lawyer (pro se) in the United States v. Anthony Accetturo et al. RICO trial, famous for being the longest federal trial in history (at 21 months). This trial was conducted while DiNorscio was already incarcerated on separate drug charges. He was ultimately found not guilty (along with his fellow co-defendants) after a short deliberation by the jury. After the trial, DiNorscio went back to prison; he was released on November 23, 2002, after serving 17.5 years of a 30-year sentence. 

The film Find Me Guilty is based on this trial. DiNorscio died in November 2004, near the end of shooting.

Philadelphia family
The longtime Don of the Philadelphia crime family, Angelo "Gentle Don" Bruno, was killed on March 21, 1980, resulting in a huge power vacuum. Anthony Accetturo and Michael Taccetta, on the other hand, used their situation to establish a new foothold in Philadelphia as a part of the Jersey Crew, with illegal gambling and loansharking operations. Because of the bad relations between the two factions in Philadelphia's crime family, as well as both Taccetta and Accetturo taking advantage of the situation, the relationship between Philadelphia and the New York Families, especially the Luccheses, eventually turned worse than ever and cooperation between the families eventually ended. It was around this time that prominent Bruno member, DiNorscio, along with many others, defected to the New Jersey faction of the Lucchese crime family to earn greater profits and to avoid being killed.

Federal RICO (and other charges) trial
During the early 1980s, U.S. law enforcement started an operation to discover and prosecute all organized crime activities in the North Jersey area. 

After a four-year-long investigation indictments were brought up toward 20 members of the Jersey Crew. Accetturo was brought from Florida, the Taccetta brothers were arrested in Newark, and 17 other known members were put on trial for 76 Racketeer Influenced and Corrupt Organizations Act (RICO) predicates. These charges of criminal activity claimed that the Lucchese Family participated in loansharking, extortion, racketeering, illegal gambling, money laundering, drug trafficking, arson, thefts, as well as murder and conspiracy to commit murder. The trial began in November 1986. 

During the trial, DiNorscio went on to fire his lawyer and represent himself during the entire trial. Although not popular with Accetturo and Taccetta, DiNorscio is reported to have charmed the jury; as the trial ended in 1988, all twenty defendants were acquitted, with a great deal of "pull" attributed to the congenial personality demonstrated by DiNorscio while he represented himself against the charges. The prosecutors were stunned and it is claimed that the Jersey Crew went right back where they left off in their criminal enterprises before the RICO trial.

References

External links
Federal Bureau of Prisons Inmate Locator Website 

 

American gangsters of Italian descent
Lucchese crime family
Philadelphia crime family
Lucchese crime family New Jersey faction
Gangsters from Philadelphia
1940 births
2004 deaths